(25 December 1927 – 10 October 2014) was a Japanese mathematician working on algebraic groups who introduced the Satake isomorphism and Satake diagrams. He was considered an iconic figure in the theory of linear algebraic groups and symmetric spaces.

Satake was born in Tokyo, Japan in 1927, and received his Ph.D. at the University of Tokyo in 1959 under the supervision of Shokichi Iyanaga. He was a professor at University of California, Berkeley from 1968 to 1983. After retirement he returned to Japan, where he spent time at Tohoku University and Chuo University. He died of respiratory failure on 10 October 2014.

Although they are often attributed to William Thurston, Satake was the first to introduce orbifold, which he did in the 1950s under the name of V-manifold. In , he gave the modern definition, along with the basic calculus of smooth functions and differential forms. He demonstrated that the de Rham theorem and Poincaré duality, along with their proofs, carry over to the orbifold setting. In , he demonstrated that the standard tensor calculus of bundles, connections, and curvature also carries over to orbifolds, along with the Chern-Gauss-Bonnet theorem and Shiing-Shen Chern's proof thereof.

Major publications

References

External links

 
 FORMULA IN SIMPLE JORDAN ALGEBRAS ICHIRO SATAKE (Received May 7, 1984)

1927 births
2014 deaths
Deaths from respiratory failure
20th-century Japanese mathematicians
21st-century Japanese mathematicians
University of California, Berkeley faculty
University of Tokyo alumni
Academic staff of Tohoku University
Academic staff of Chuo University
University of Chicago faculty
People from Tokyo
Group theorists
Topologists